Wonhyo (617 – 686) was one of the leading thinkers, writers and commentators of the Korean Buddhist tradition. Essence-Function, a key concept in East Asian Buddhism and particularly Korean Buddhism, was refined in the syncretic philosophy and world view of Wonhyo.

As one of the most eminent scholar-monks in Korean history, he was an influential figure in the development of the East Asian Buddhist intellectual and commentarial tradition. His extensive literary output runs to over 80 works in 240 fascicles, and some of his commentaries, such as those on the Mahāyāna Mahāparinirvāṇa Sūtra and the Awakening of Faith in the Mahayana, became classics revered throughout China and Japan as well as Korea. In fact, his commentary on the Awakening of Faith helped to make it one of the most influential and intensively studied texts in the East Asian Mahāyāna tradition. Chinese masters who were heavily influenced by Wonhyo include Fazang, Li Tongxuan, and Chengguan. The Japanese monks Gyōnen, Zenshu and Joto of the Kegon school were also influenced by him.

With his life spanning the end of the Three Kingdoms of Korea and the beginning of Unified Silla, Wonhyo played a vital role in the reception and assimilation of the broad range of doctrinal Buddhist streams that flowed into the Korean peninsula at the time. Wonhyo was most interested in and affected by Buddha-nature, East Asian Yogācāra and Hwaeom thought. However, in his extensive scholarly works, composed as commentaries and essays, he embraced the whole spectrum of the Buddhist teachings which were received in Korea, including such schools as Pure Land Buddhism, East Asian Mādhyamaka and the Tiantai.

Biography

Wonhyo was born in Amnyang (押梁), nowadays the city of Gyeongsan, North Gyeongsang Province, South Korea. He had a son, Seol Chong, who is considered to be one of the great Confucian scholars of Silla.

Wonhyo was famous for singing and dancing in the streets. While the Buddha discouraged such behaviors, his songs and dances were seen as upaya, or skillful means, meant to help save all sentient beings.

He is thought to have founded Korea's lone riverside temple, Silleuksa, in the late 600s. While Wonhyo was in Bunhwangsa (in modern Guhwang-dong, Gyeongju), he wrote a number of books. For such strong association with Wonhyo, a research center and a shrine named Bogwangjeon hall dedicated to Wonhyo's legacy are located in Bunhwangsa.

Contribution to commentarial tradition
He wrote commentaries on virtually all of the most influential Mahayana scriptures, altogether including over eighty works in over two hundred fascicles. Among his most influential works were the commentaries he wrote on the Awakening of Faith, Mahāparinirvāṇa Sūtra and Vajrasamādhi sūtra, along with his exposition on the meaning of the two hindrances, the ijangui. These were treated with utmost respect by leading Buddhist scholars in China and Japan, and served to help in placing the Awakening of Faith as the most influential text in the Korean tradition.

Philosophy

One mind theory
He expounded his "one mind theory" or yixinshixiang(一心思想,일심사상) on his works of "Treatise on the sutra of the diamond samadhi" and "treatise on the awakening of faith in the Mahayhana". The theory set the return to an original enlightenment by gaining insight about the human mind as an ultimate goal and emphasized the act of practising the six paramitas.

Hwajaeng theory
Wonhyo viewed that all sutras from different buddhist sects are based on one truth and seek to unite them based on the single truth principle in a much higher level. The theory was called hwa jaeng theory and was summarized in his work "The treatise to harmonize the different conflicts into ten sentences(十門和諍論, 십문화쟁론)". Wonhyo traced the origin of such conflicts from obsession to say things that are different to be the same and things that are same to be different and claims they are neither the same nor different.

Teaching story
Wonhyo spent the earlier part of his career as a monk. In 661 he and a close friend -  Uisang (625–702, founder of the Hwaeom) - were traveling to China where they hoped to study Buddhism further.  Somewhere in the region of Baekje, the pair were caught in a heavy downpour and forced to take shelter in what they believed to be an earthen sanctuary. During the night Wonhyo was overcome with thirst, and reaching out grasped what he perceived to be a gourd, and drinking from it was refreshed with a draught of cool, refreshing water. Upon waking the next morning, however, the companions discovered much to their amazement that their shelter was in fact an ancient tomb littered with human skulls, and the vessel from which Wonhyo had drunk was a human skull full of brackish water. Upon seeing this, Wonhyo vomited. Startled by the experience of believing that a gruesome liquid was a refreshing treat, Wonhyo was astonished at the power of the human mind to transform reality. After this "One Mind" enlightenment experience, he abandoned his plan to go to China. He left the priesthood and turned to the spreading of the Buddhadharma as a layman. Because of this aspect of his character, Wonhyo ended up becoming a popular folk hero in Korea. An important result of his combined work with Uisang was the establishment of Hwaeom as the dominant stream of doctrinal thought on the Korean Peninsula.

English translation project 
Wonhyo's twenty-three extant works are currently in the process of being translated into English as a joint project between Dongguk University and Stony Brook University.  The University of Hawaii Press is publishing them in five volumes.

Wonhyo Pilgrimage Project
In 2011, retired Canadian journalist Tony MacGregor walked across the Korean Peninsula in an attempt to understand the awakening experience of Wonhyo. Legend says that Wonhyo walked across the peninsula in the 7th century and found enlightenment in a cave on the western side of the peninsula. MacGregor's journey, which involved staying at mountain monasteries and talking to monks, was the first in over 1,000 years to honor Wonhyo's accomplishment. A documentary film of the walk was completed  and a project to establish a permanent pilgrimage trail is currently being developed.

Legacy
The International Taekwon-Do Federation pattern "Won-Hyo" is named in Wonhyo's honor. This pattern consists of 28 movements.

The World Taekwondo Federation has a Hyeong or pattern named Ilyeo for 9th Dan black belt which means the thought of the Buddhist priest of Silla Dynasty, Wonhyo.

Wonhyo Bridge across the Han River in Seoul is named after him.

Notes

Further reading
Buswell, Robert E., Jr. "The Biographies of the Korean Monk Wŏnhyo (617-686): A Study in Buddhist Hagiography." Peter H Lee, ed. Biography as Genre in Korean Literature. Berkeley: Center for Korean Studies, 1989.
Buswell, Robert E., Jr. Cultivating Original Enlightenment: Wonhyo's Exposition of the Vajrasamādhi-Sūtra. University of Hawaii Press, 2007.
Kim, Jong-in. Philosophical contexts for Wŏnhyo's interpretation of Buddhism. Seoul: Jimoondang, 2004.
Muller, A. Charles; Nguyen, Cuong T. Wŏnhyo's Philosophy of Mind. University of Hawaii Press, 2012
Muller, A. Charles(ed.) Wonhyo: Selected works. Jogye Order of Korean Buddhism, 2012
Muller, A. Charles (2007). "Wonhyo's Reliance on Huiyuan in his Exposition of the Two Hindrances". In: Imre Hamar, ed., Reflecting Mirrors: Perspectives on Huayan Buddhism, Harrassowitz Verlag, pp. 281–295
Muller, A. Charles (2002). "Wŏnhyo's Interpretation of the Hindrances". International Journal of Buddhist Thought and Culture. Vol. 2, 2003. pp. 123–135.Source:  (accessed: January 7, 2008)
Muller, A. Charles (2000). "On Wŏnhyo's Ijangui (二障義)." Journal of Korean Buddhist Seminar, Vol. 8, July 2000, p. 322-336.Source:  (accessed: January 7, 2008)
Muller, A. Charles (1995).  "The Key Operative Concepts in Korean Buddhist Syncretic Philosophy; Interpenetration and Essence-Function in Wŏnhyo, Chinul and Kihwa",Bulletin of Toyo Gakuen University, vol. 3 (1995), pp. 33–48.
Sung-bae Park (2008). 'Wonhyo: Coming to the West―Yet No One Recognizes Him.', International Journal of Buddhist Thought & Culture 10, 7–18.

7th-century Korean philosophers
Korean scholars of Buddhism
Silla Buddhist monks
Hwaeom Buddhists
617 births
686 deaths
Muism